is a Japanese actress, voice actress and singer from Yokohama. She was a member of the group Shoujotai (少女隊).

Filmography

Anime
 Animation Runner Kuromi (Hamako Shihonmatsu)
 Ashita no Nadja (Collette Preminger)
 Carried by the Wind: Tsukikage Ran (Tsukikage Ran)
 Fruits Basket (Saki Hanajima, Kyoko Honda)
 Grrl Power (Narrator)
 Jubei-chan and Jubei-chan 2 (Mikage Tsumura)
 Mushishi (Yahagi)
 Now and Then, Here and There (Abelia; also performed the series end theme)

Dubbing
Detective Dee: The Four Heavenly Kings, Empress Wu Zetian (Carina Lau)
Paul Blart: Mall Cop, Amy Anderson (Jayma Mays)
Young Detective Dee: Rise of the Sea Dragon, Empress Wu Zetian (Carina Lau)

References

External links
 Official blog 
 Official website 
 Official agency profile 
 

1969 births
Living people
Voice actresses from Yokohama
Japanese voice actresses